Julius Sturm (21 July 1816 - 2 May 1896), German poet, was born at Köstritz in the principality of Reuss.

He studied theology at Jena from 1837 to 1841, and was appointed preceptor to the hereditary prince Heinrich XIV, Prince Reuss Younger Line. In 1851 he became pastor of Göschitz near Schleiz, and in 1857 at his native village of Köstritz. In 1885 he retired with the title of Geheimkirchen rat. He died in Leipzig.

Sturm was a writer of lyrics and sonnets and of church poetry, breathing a spirit of deep piety and patriotism.

His religious poems were published in:
Fromme Lieder (Devout Songs and Poems; pt. i., Leipzig, 1852; 12th ed., 1893; pt. ii., 1858; pt. iii., 1892)
Zwei Rosen, oder das hohe Lied der Liebe (Two Roses, or the Canticle of Love; Leipzig, 1854; 2nd ed., 1892)
Israelitische Lieder (Israelite Songs; 3rd ed., Halle, 1881)
Palme und Krone (Palm and Crown; Leipzig, 1888)
His chief lyrics were issued in:
Gedichte (6th ed., Leipzig, 1892)
Neue Gedichte (2nd ed., Leipzig, 1880)
Lieder und Bilder (2nd ed., 1892)
Kampf- und Siegergedichte (Poems of Battle and Victory; Halle, 1870)
Neue Lieder (1880, 2nd ed., 1888)
Neue lyrische Gedichte (Leipzig)
In Freud und Leid, letzte Lieder (1896).

Family
His son August Sturm (born 1852) was also a noted poet as well as being a lawyer. He was born at Göschitz, and studied at Jena, Leipzig, and Berlin, first theology, afterwards law, which he began practicing at Naumburg in 1884, having in the meanwhile lived as assessor at Rudolstadt (1880–82) and, given to literary pursuits, in Berlin (1882–84).

Besides the epic poems, Merlin (1892), Kaiser Friedrich der Edle (1896), König Laurins Rosengarten (1897), and Der König von Babel (1902), he published Hohenzollernsagen and Balladen (1898), the lyrics Auf Flügeln des Gesanges (On wings of song, 1883), Lied und Leben (1889), Auf der Höhe (1902), and others, several dramas and the sketches in prose, Sylter Skizzen (1887).

He also wrote a series of juridical works, notably Revision der gemeinrechtlichen Lehre vom Gewohnheitsrecht (1900).

His son Heinrich Sturm (1860–1917) was a jurist and politician, and mayor of Chemnitz 1908-1917.

Notes

References
  This work also cites Hepding and Hoffman.
  This work also cites Hepding and Hoffman.
Attribution
  This work in turn cites:
A. Hepding, Julius Sturm (Giessen, 1896)
F. Hoffmann, Julius Sturm (Hamburg, 1898)

External links

 

1816 births
1896 deaths
People from Reuss
University of Jena alumni
German poets
German male poets
19th-century poets
19th-century German writers
19th-century German male writers